The Bahamas Reef Environmental Educational Foundation (BREEF) is a non-government organization in the Bahamas devoted to the conservation of the marine environment.  It campaigns to preserve the coral reef ecosystems in the seas around the Bahamas, to protect local fishing grounds, and is also involved in education.  Based in Nassau, it was founded by Sir Nicholas Nuttall, 3rd Baronet in 1993 as a voluntary organisation.  Its first executive director was hired in 2002.

External links
Website

Environmental organisations based in the Bahamas